is an American actor and martial artist of Japanese and Chinese descent.

The son of Japanese martial arts film star Sho Kosugi, Kane began his career as a child actor starring opposite his father in films like Revenge of the Ninja and Pray for Death. He first gained recognition in Japan for his starring role as Jiraiya (Ninja Black) in Ninja Sentai Kakuranger, being the second American-born sentai ranger. He has appeared in over 30 films and television series, including the video game adaptations DOA: Dead or Alive and Street Fighter Alpha. He competed on six seasons of the obstacle challenge program Sasuke, where he was the first American competitor.

Like his father, Kosugi has appeared in both Japanese and American media. In Japan, Kane is considered gaijin tarento (foreign talent) due to his Nisei (second generation) foreign born heritage. Kane's mother, Shook Gim Chan, was born in China.

Acting career
Since 1983, Kosugi has appeared in various roles as a voice actor for video games, stunt actor in movies and character actor in both English language and Japanese language films. His first movie, Revenge of the Ninja, had him playing the son of his real life father, Sho Kosugi. Kane kept his real name in the movie. He has also been in other movies starring his father as well. With the intention of following in his father's footsteps, Kane trained to become a martial arts actor. Kane has an extensive martial arts background in wushu, ninjutsu, taekwondo, karate, judo and kendo.

He made his Japanese acting debut in the 1993 television series Ryūkyū no Kaze (Dragon Spirit), the 31st entry in NHK's long-running taiga drama series. Kane followed this up with his first lead film role in the two-part Toei V-Cinema movies Za Kakuto Oh (The Fighting King) and Za Kakuto Oh 2 (The Fighting King 2) directed by his father. Next came the 1994 television series Ninja Sentai Kakuranger, an installment in Toei's Super Sentai franchise. Kane was the only American-born cast member of Kakuranger and his character (Jiraiya) spoke almost exclusively in English during his first few episodes.

He could be seen regularly on the NHK children's program Karada de Asobo (体で遊ぼ), which was a weekday exercise show that ran until March 2010. He also does commercial spots for vitamin drinks and regularly appears on a physical challenge show called Kinniku Oukoku (筋肉王国), formerly known as Kinniku Banzuke. He had a brief role as a Yakuza member in the action-thriller, War, with Jason Statham and Jet Li.

Kane then began to work in China and Hong Kong. He played Ryu Hayabusa, a master Ninja in the live action adaptation of the video game DOA: Dead or Alive, directed by Corey Yuen. He would play the lead villain in Coweb, the directorial debut of Xiong Xin Xin and the lead role debut of Jiang Lui Xia. In 2011, he appeared alongside real-life best friend Sammy Hung and Sammy's father, Sammo Hung in Choy Lee Fut.

In 2013, Kane played the lead villain Nakamura in the film Ninja: Shadow of a Tear opposite Scott Adkins. The two reunited on the film Zero Tolerance. Kane would also play the character of Kazuya Mishima in the prequel Tekken 2: Kazuya's Revenge in 2014. In 2016, Kane played "God Lee" in the Takashi Miike-directed adaptation of manga and anime Terra Formars. He went to China to play a disfigured assassin in the straight to streaming action-horror film Heaven Inspector, followed by a role as "The Rider" in the recently released film The Driver opposite Mark Dacascos. He is set to reunite with Dacascos on One Night in Bangkok while another film he shot, Maxx, is currently in post-production.

Sportsman No. 1

From 1997 to 2004, Kane participated in the Japanese physical competition program Sportsman No.1 Decisive Battle, competing first against other celebrities and then against professional athletes, achieving unparalleled success winning a record 6 tournaments and finishing second in 4 others.

Sasuke
Kane competed on Kinniku Banzuke/Oukoku's special show Sasuke (known in America as Ninja Warrior) for several years (from 1997 - 2001). Thus far he is one of only four foreigners (with the others being Jordan Jovtchev from Bulgaria in SASUKE 8, Lee En-Chih from Taiwan in SASUKE 24, and René Kaselowsky from Germany in SASUKE 37), and the only American, to make it to the Final Stage in SASUKE, out of 3,700 total competitors to date and twenty-seven different Final Stage competitors. Despite his strong performances, #98 is the highest number he has ever worn.

He stopped participating after the 8th competition. Around the time of SASUKE 11, in an interview with the Kinniku Banzuke successor, Taiku Ookoku, he said, "私は訓練に時間があれば、私は競争したいと思います。", which roughly translates to, "If I have time to train, I would like to compete." Kane is still the only competitor to compete five times without failing the first stage. He was the first competitor to beat the Spider Climb in the final stage, doing so in Sasuke 8.

After a 21 year absence on the show, Kane appeared again in SASUKE 40. He kept his streak of first stage clears alive, and became the oldest competitor to ever clear the First Stage at age 48.

Here is a table of information of his participation in Sasuke.

Personal life
Kane was born in Los Angeles, California on October 11, 1974 as the eldest of three siblings. His parents are legendary Ninja film actor Sho Kosugi, who is Japanese; and Shook Kosugi, who is Chinese Hakka. Kane has a brother, Shane (born 1976), who made occasional appearances on Kinniku Banzuke (known on G4 as Unbeatable Bansuke) and Sasuke as well as appear as Kane's younger brother in some of their father's ninja films in the 80's; and a sister, Ayeesha (born 1983), who is a golfer and a former senior at University of Las Vegas. He was romantically involved with female golfer Riko Higashio, but broke up in 2005 when they seemed on the verge of marriage. In December 2009, Kane married a woman from Hong Kong. On March 4, 2019, Kane became a dad when his wife gave birth to a baby daughter.

Rift with father
Kosugi and his father were seemingly no longer on speaking terms due to Kane choosing a career in Japanese television instead of helping to run some of his schools under the banner of his institute, and even taking some of Sho's staff with him. In reference to Kane, Sho was reported as saying on a television show with fortuneteller Kazuko Hosoki in April 2007, saying Kane "stabbed me in the back" and at one point made a reference to Judas Iscariot. However, Sho was seen at Kane's wedding in late 2009, indicating that they are reconciling or already have.

Filmography

Film

Television

Video games

References

External links
 
 

1974 births
American male film actors
American film actors of Asian descent
American male karateka
American male taekwondo practitioners
American wushu practitioners
American male judoka
American stunt performers
American male voice actors
Expatriate television personalities in Japan
Living people
Sasuke (TV series) contestants
American male actors of Japanese descent
American male actors of Chinese descent
20th-century American male actors
21st-century American male actors